Crusino II Sommaripa (died ca. 1500) was the lord of Andros from 1468, succeeding his brother Giovanni.

References

Sources
 

1500s deaths
Crusino 02
Crusino 02